The 1st Commandos Company "Iquique" is special forces unit under the jurisdiction of northern Chile.

Division
The unit is part of the 2nd Armored Brigade "Cazadores" (2º Brigada Acorzada "Cazadores" in Spanish) of the Sixth Army Division based in the first region of the country.

Restructuring of Chilean Army
The Chilean Army has been restructured into more independent armored brigades, and shaped only by professional people, meaning that each squad possesses a special forces unit.

References

External links 
Official Chilean Army site 

Chilean Army
Special forces of Chile
Company sized units